Aegidius (died 464 or 465) was a magister militum in Gaul.

Aegidius, Ægidius, or Egidius may also refer to:

Pre-modern era
Chronological order
 Saint Aegidius or Saint Giles (c. 650–c. 710), hermit saint from Athens
 Aegidius Corboliensis or Gilles de Corbeil (c. 1140–first quarter of the 13th century), physician
 Egidius Parisiensis (c. 1160–1223/1224), French poet
 Egidius Smaragd (fl. c. 1185–1215), Hungarian noble of French origin
 Aegidius of Assisi (c. 1190–1262), one of the original companions of saint Francis of Assisi
 Egidius Monoszló (c. 1240–1313), Hungarian baron
 Aegidius de Lessinia (died c. 1304), scholastic philosopher, pupil of Thomas Aquinas
 Aegidius Romanus or Giles of Rome (c. 1243–1316), archbishop of Bourges and philosopher
 Egidius de Francia or Egidius de Murino, sometimes Magister Frater Egidius, French composer and music theorist in Italy
 Egidius (Chantilly Codex composer) (c. 1350–1400), sometimes Magister Egidius, composer in the Chantilly Codex
 Egidius Cantoris (one of the two leaders of the Men of Understanding, a heretical sect
 Aegidius Campensis or Gilles Deschamps, bishop of Coutances present at the trial of Joan of Arc, teacher of Jean Gerson
 Egidius Binchois, usually known as Gilles Binchois (c. 1400–1460), Franco-Flemish composer
 Aegidius of Viterbo or Aegidius Canisius (1472–1532), Italian cardinal, theologian, orator, humanist and poet

Modern era
Alphabetical order by last name
 Egidius Braun (born 1925), president of the Deutscher Fußball-Bund
 Aegidius Bucherius (1576–1665), French Jesuit and chronological scholar
 Ægidius Elling (1861–1949), Norwegian inventor
 Aegidius Gelenius (1595–1656), Cologne historian
 Aegidius Hunnius (1550–1603), Lutheran theologian
 Egidius Junger (1833–1895), German-born bishop of Nesqually
 Egidius Juška (born 1975), retired Lithuanian soccer player
 Aegidius Rousselet (1610–1686), also known as Gilles Rousselet, French engraver
 Aegidius Sadeler (c. 1570–1629), Flemish baroque era painter and engraver
 Egidius Slanghen (1820–1882), mayor of Hoensbroek, Netherlands
 Aegidius Tschudi (1505–1572), Swiss writer

See also
 Egidio, a list of people with the given name
 Egide, a list of people with the given name

Masculine given names